Kay van Dijk (born 25 June 1984) is a Dutch volleyball player, a member of Netherlands men's national volleyball team in 2003-2013 and Persian club Peykan Tehran volleyball club, a participant of the Olympic Games Athens 2004, a silver medalist of the European League 2008, Belgium Champion (2008), Slovenian Champion (2011).

Career
Dijk famous team member in 2014 he was a player of Trentino Volley, but during the season 2014/2015 he moved to the Polish club ZAKSA Kędzierzyn-Koźle and signed one-year contract. He replaced in the team Grzegorz Bociek - opposite hitter, who informed about interruption of sporting career because of serious disease. In April 2015 he left Polish club.

Sporting achievements

Clubs

CEV Cup

  2007/2008 - with Noliko Maaseik

National championship
 2005/2006  Belgium Championship, with Noliko Maaseik
 2006/2007  Belgium Cup, with Noliko Maaseik
 2006/2007  Belgium Championship, with Noliko Maaseik
 2007/2008  Belgium Cup, with Noliko Maaseik
 2007/2008  Belgium Championship, with Noliko Maaseik
 2010/2011  Slovenian Cup, with ACH Volley Ljubljana
 2010/2011  Slovenian Championship, with ACH Volley Ljubljana

National team
 2008  European League

References

External links
 Official site
 FIVB profile
 LegaVolley Serie A player profile
 PlusLiga player profile

1984 births
Living people
Dutch men's volleyball players
Dutch expatriate sportspeople in Poland
Expatriate volleyball players in Poland
Olympic volleyball players of the Netherlands
People from Renkum
Volleyball players at the 2004 Summer Olympics
ZAKSA Kędzierzyn-Koźle players
PAOK V.C. players
Sportspeople from Gelderland
Expatriate volleyball players in Greece
Expatriate volleyball players in South Korea
Expatriate volleyball players in Belgium
Expatriate volleyball players in Slovenia
Expatriate volleyball players in the Czech Republic
Expatriate volleyball players in Turkey
Expatriate volleyball players in Italy
Expatriate volleyball players in Iran
Expatriate volleyball players in the United Arab Emirates
Expatriate volleyball players in China
Expatriate volleyball players in Russia
Dutch expatriate sportspeople in Greece
Dutch expatriate sportspeople in South Korea
Dutch expatriate sportspeople in Belgium
Dutch expatriate sportspeople in Slovenia
Dutch expatriate sportspeople in the Czech Republic
Dutch expatriate sportspeople in Turkey
Dutch expatriate sportspeople in Italy
Dutch expatriate sportspeople in Iran
Dutch expatriate sportspeople in the United Arab Emirates
Dutch expatriate sportspeople in China
Dutch expatriate sportspeople in Russia